Julian Knowle and Jürgen Melzer were the defending champions, but did not participate this year.

Jordan Kerr and David Škoch won in the final 7–6(7–4), 1–6, [10–4], against Łukasz Kubot and Oliver Marach.

Seeds

Draw

Draw

External links
Draw

Doubles